Abdul Hye Sikder is a Bangladeshi poet. He is a former executive director of Nazrul Institute and vice president of Jatiya Nazrul Samaj. He received the Bangla Academy Literary Award in 2003.

Education and career
Sikder completed his bachelor's and master's in Bengali literature from Rajshahi University. He worked as the Chief of Feature Services of the national news agency Bangladesh Sangbad Sangstha (BSS) and assistant Editor of Daily Inqilab. Sikder served as executive director of Nazrul Institute Dhaka from 2005 to 2006. He is currently the assistant editor of Daily Amar Desh and as Associate Professor of the University of Development Alternative.

Sikder serves as the president of Mukhush Natya Sangstha.

Personal life
Sikder is married to Abida Sikder. They have a son, Param Wazed Sikder and a daughter, Prokriti Wazed Sikder.

Awards
 Natun Gati Sahittya Purashkar, 2010 (Kolkata, India)
 Kishorkantho Sahittyo Purashkar, 2006
 Churulia Nazrul Academy Award, 2005 (West Bengal, India)
 Bangla Academy Literary Award, 2003
 Kurigram Press Club Songbardhana, 2003
 Poet Talim Hossain Trust Shahittya Purashkar, 2003
 Moniruddin Yousuf Shahittya Padak, 2002
 Alpana Shahittya Purashkar, 2002
 Jatiya Nazrul Samaj Padak, 2001
 Kalchakra Swadhinata Padak, 2001
 Bochaganj Press Club Songbardhana, 2000
 JISAS Nazrul Padak, 1999
 Glassgo Bengali Performing Arts Padak, 1995

Bibliography

On Kazi Nazrul Islam
Kobitirtha Chrulia (1997)
Nazrul in Bangladesh: Nazrul's Bangladesh (2003)
Bangladeshi Nazrul Chorcha: Mukhosh O Bastabota (2003)
Kemal Pasha: In the Eyes of Kazi Nazrul Islam (2006)
Moharram in Nazrul (2006)
Chitrokalay Nazrul (2006)
Jatiyo Kabi and Shaheed Zia (2006)
Biswamoy Nazrul (2009)

Poetry
Ashi Lokksyo Bhor (1987)
Agun Amar Bhai (1991)
Manab Bijoy Kabbo (1992)
Jugalbandhi Bhugolmoy (1992)
Railing Dhara Nadi (1994)
Ei Boddhyabhumi Ekdin Swadesh Chilo (1997)
Kabita Samogra (2001)
Dudhkumarer Janalaguli (2001)
Loadshedding Namiache (2001)
Sundarban Gatha (2003)
Meghmatrik Dhatutantrik (2004)
Sreshto Kobita (2006)
Hafiz, Ei Je Amar Darkhasto (2007)
Oti Murgi Hoilo (2008)
Talaknama (2010)

Short stories
Sukur Mamuder Chuattar Ghat (1998)

Travel
Vraman Somogra (2003)
Phire Phire Ashi (2003)
Sonargaon: Antare Baire Tumi Rupkatha (2001)
Nippon Ni Sasagu, Plassy Trazedir 234 Bachar Por (1992)
Dadir Boner Gach Birikshi (2005)
Darun Sundar Sundarbaon (2005)
Pakhibandhu Onik Uddan (2004)
Bagh Bahadur (2002)
Adventure Kochikhali (2002)
Srabontir Moner Mayabari (2002)
Fulporir Sab Mone Ache (2002)
Vasper Kespar (2003)
Amader Dadi (2003)
Kathabagher Rahoshya (2003)
Bagher Mohan Dari Smrity (2003)
Somoy Chilo Dupur (2002)
Gan Pakhider Din (2001)
Euliara Path Haralo (2001)
Moulana Bhashani (1995)
Chara Samagro (2009)
Haciko (2009)
Tom ’71 (2009)
Amader Tom Ke Jano (2008)

Biography
Jana Ajana Moulana Bhashani (1997)
Moniruddin Yousuf (1992)

Essays
Bangla Shahittyo: Nakkshotrer Nayokera (2003)
Bangladesher Path (2000)
Monishar Mukh (2003)
Zia Uchched Prokalpo (2010)

Book on film
Bangladesher Chalaschitro: Itihasher Ek Oddhya (1999)

Books edited
Syed Ali Ahsan Smrak Grantho (2005)
Moniruddin Yousufer Upannash Samogro (2003)
Moulana Bhasanir Hok Katha (2003)
Obishsmaronio Sat November (2002)
Je Agun Chariey Dile (1993)
Moniruddin Yousufer Agranthito Kabita (1991)
Amader Milito Sangram Moulana Bhashanir Nam (1986)
Challish Bacharer Premer Kabita (1984)

Filmography
Comillai Nazrul 
Trishale Nazrul
Chattagrame Nazrul

References

Living people
Bangladeshi male poets
University of Rajshahi alumni
Recipients of Bangla Academy Award
Year of birth missing (living people)